Volcan Club de Moroni is a football club from the Comoros based in Moroni.

Achievements
Comoros Premier League: 4
 1998–99, 2015, 2018, 2022.

Comoros Cup: 4
 1983–84, 2005–06, 2014, 2016.

Comoros Super Cup: 0

Performance in CAF competitions
CAF Confederation Cup: 1 appearance
2015 – Preliminary Round

CAF Champions League: 1 appearance
2016 – Preliminary Round

Football clubs in the Comoros